Jackson, Rhode Island is an unincorporated area outlying, to the northwest, West Warwick.

Cranston, Rhode Island